Dorogi may refer to:

"Roads" (Red Army Choir song), 1945
 Dorogi FC, a football club from Dorog, Hungary
 Attila Dorogi (born 1987), Hungarian football player